Cornelis Gerardus René Lotz (born 18 April 1938) is a retired Dutch cyclist who was active between 1957 and 1960. In 1960 he won the Tour of Austria and finished in fourth place in the 100 km team time trial at the 1960 Summer Olympics. He also competed in the individual road race at the 1960 Olympics.

See also
 List of Dutch Olympic cyclists

References

1938 births
Living people
Dutch male cyclists
Olympic cyclists of the Netherlands
Cyclists at the 1960 Summer Olympics
People from Stein, Limburg
Cyclists from Limburg (Netherlands)